Denis Devlin (15 April 1908 – 21 August 1959) was, along with Samuel Beckett, Thomas MacGreevy and Brian Coffey, one of the generation of Irish modernist poets to emerge at the end of the 1920s. He was also a career diplomat.

Early life and studies

He was born in Greenock, Scotland of Irish parents, and his family returned to live in Dublin in 1918. He studied at Belvedere College and, from 1926, as a seminarian for the Roman Catholic priesthood at Clonliffe College. As part of his studies he attended a degree course in modern languages at University College Dublin (UCD), where he met and befriended Brian Coffey. Together they published a joint collection, Poems, in 1930.

In 1927, Devlin abandoned the priesthood and left Clonliffe. He graduated with from UCD his BA in 1930 and spent that summer on the Blasket Islands to improve his spoken Irish. Between 1930 and 1933, he studied literature at Munich University and the Sorbonne in Paris, meeting, amongst others, Beckett and Thomas MacGreevy. He then returned to UCD to complete his MA thesis on Montaigne.

His niece went on to become writer Denyse Woods.

Diplomatic career and later writings

He joined the Irish Diplomatic Service in 1935 and spent a number of years in Rome, New York and Washington. During this time he met the French poet St. John Perse, and the Americans Allen Tate and Robert Penn Warren. He went on to publish a translation of Exile and Other Poems by St-John Perse, and Tate and Warren edited his posthumous Selected Poems.

Since his death, there have been two Collected Poems published; the first in 1964 was edited by Coffey and the second in 1989 by J.C.C. Mays.

His personal papers are held in University College Dublin Archives.

References

Sources
Coffey, Brian. Biographical note in Denis Devlin Collected Poems (The Dolmen Press, 1964)
Denis Devlin at Ricorso
Jack Morgan. Denis Devlin (1908-1959). In: Modern Irish Writers: A Bio-Critical Sourcebook.  Alexander G. Gonzalez (Editor), pp. 64–68. Greenwood Publishing Group, 1997.

External links
Poetry by Denis Devlin, at Wake Forest University Press

1908 births
1959 deaths
University of Paris alumni
Irish modernist poets
Scottish people of Irish descent
Irish diplomats
People from Greenock
People educated at Belvedere College
20th-century Irish poets
Irish expatriates in France